Gergely Salim (born April 1, 1972 in Dar-es-Salaam, Tanzania) is a Hungarian-Danish taekwondo practitioner, but lives now in Los Angeles as an American citizen.

He is the father of the Tanzanian-American taekwondoka Omar Salim.

Career 
He started practicing taekwondo at the age of 8 with his brother, Joseph Salim, at Gladsaxe Taekwondo Klub near Copenhagen.

In 1991, Gergely Salim won a gold medal in the finweight division at the World Taekwondo Championships in Athens. Next year, at the age of 20, he participated in the 1992 Summer Olympics in Barcelona and claimed a gold medal. He also won three consecutive European Championships from 1990 to 1994 for the Danish national team.

His older brother, Joseph Salim, also pursued a great career in the sport as he also was a 3-time european champion and runner-up at the 1991 world championship.

In 2021, Salim's youngest son, Omar Salim, won the gold medal at the 2021 European Taekwondo Championships representing Hungary.

References

External links
 
 
 

1972 births
Living people
Danish male taekwondo practitioners
Hungarian male taekwondo practitioners
Olympic medalists in taekwondo
Olympic gold medalists for Denmark
Taekwondo practitioners at the 1992 Summer Olympics
Medalists at the 1992 Summer Olympics
World Taekwondo Championships medalists
European Taekwondo Championships medalists